Saroj Kumar Yadav (or Saroj Yadav; Nepali: सरोज कुमार यादव) is a Nepalese politician who serves as the chief minister of Madhesh from People's Socialist Party, Nepal. He was also the 1st Speaker of the Madhesh Provincial  Assembly.

References

External links 

Living people
 1972 births
Madhesi people
21st-century Nepalese politicians
Members of the Provincial Assembly of Madhesh Province